Erick Travez Dampier (born July 14, 1975) is an American former professional basketball player. He played in the National Basketball Association (NBA) for the Indiana Pacers, Golden State Warriors, Dallas Mavericks, Miami Heat and Atlanta Hawks. He is a 6 ft 11 in / 265 lb. center.

High school and college career
Dampier played competitively at Lawrence County High School in Monticello, Mississippi, where he led the rural county to two state championships. Dampier played college basketball at Mississippi State University. While there he became a member of Kappa Alpha Psi. He was an early entry to the 1996 NBA draft after his junior season, in which he led MSU to the 1996 Southeastern Conference tournament championship and the NCAA Final Four.

Professional career

Indiana Pacers (1996–1997)
Dampier was drafted as the tenth pick in the first round of the 1996 NBA draft by the Indiana Pacers.

He played 72 games in his rookie year with the Pacers, starting 21 of them and finishing with averages of 5.1 points and 4.1 rebounds per game.

Golden State Warriors (1997–2004)
On August 12, 1997, Dampier and Duane Ferrell were traded to the Golden State Warriors for Chris Mullin.

He spent the next seven years, primarily as the starting center, with the Warriors. On November 22, 2002, Dampier scored a career-high 31 points and grabbed 14 rebounds, during a 95–91 loss to the Milwaukee Bucks. Arguably, he hit his peak production in 2003–04 with averages of 12.3 points, 12 rebounds and 1.85 blocks per game. However, some critics claimed that he stepped up his production because he was in a contract year, and indeed he was considered a top free-agent commodity in the 2004 off-season.

Dallas Mavericks (2004–2010)
On August 24, 2004, Dampier was signed and traded to the Dallas Mavericks along with Dan Dickau, Evan Eschmeyer and rights to Steve Logan in exchange for Christian Laettner, Eduardo Nájera, 2 future first round picks, the draft rights to Luis Flores and Mladen Sekularac, and a trade exception. In his first season in Dallas he played in 59 games (starting 56), averaging 9.2 points, 8.5 rebounds and 1.85 blocks per game.

Miami Heat (2010–2011)
On July 13, 2010, Dampier was traded to the Charlotte Bobcats along with Matt Carroll and Eduardo Nájera in exchange for Tyson Chandler and Alexis Ajinça. He was waived on September 14, 2010.

On November 23, 2010, Dampier signed a contract with the Miami Heat.

Atlanta Hawks (2012)
Dampier signed a ten-day contract with the Atlanta Hawks on February 9, 2012. On February 19, 2012, a signed his second ten-day contract with the Hawks. On March 1, 2012, Dampier signed with the Hawks for the rest of the season.

NBA career statistics

Regular season

|-
| align="left" | 
| align="left" | Indiana
| 72 || 21 || 14.6 || .390 || 1.000 || .637 || 4.1 || .6 || .3 || 1.0 || 5.1
|-
| align="left" | 
| align="left" | Golden State
| 82 || 82 || 32.4 || .445 || .000 || .669 || 8.7 || 1.1 || .5 || 1.7 || 11.8
|-
| align="left" | 
| align="left" | Golden State
| 50 || 50 || 28.3 || .389 || .000 || .588 || 7.6 || 1.1 || .5 || 1.2 || 8.8
|-
| align="left" | 
| align="left" | Golden State
| 21 || 12 || 23.6 || .405 || .000 || .529 || 6.4 || .9 || .4 || .7 || 8.0
|-
| align="left" | 
| align="left" | Golden State
| 43 || 26 || 24.1 || .401 || .000 || .532 || 5.8 || 1.4 || .4 || 1.3 || 7.4
|-
| align="left" | 
| align="left" | Golden State
| 73 || 46 || 23.8 || .435 || .000 || .645 || 5.3 || 1.2 || .2 || 2.3 || 7.6
|-
| align="left" | 
| align="left" | Golden State
| 82 || 82 || 24.1 || .496 || .000 || .698 || 6.6 || .7 || .3 || 1.9 || 8.2
|-
| align="left" | 
| align="left" | Golden State
| 74 || 74 || 32.5 || .535 || .000 || .654 || 12.0 || .8 || .4 || 1.9 || 12.3
|-
| align="left" | 
| align="left" | Dallas
| 59 || 56 || 27.3 || .550 || .000 || .605 || 8.5 || .9 || .3 || 1.4 || 9.2
|-
| align="left" | 
| align="left" | Dallas
| 82 || 36 || 23.6 || .493 || .000 || .591 || 7.8 || .6 || .3 || 1.3 || 5.7
|-
| align="left" | 
| align="left" | Dallas
| 76 || 73 || 25.2 || .626 || .000 || .623 || 7.4 || .6 || .3 || 1.1 || 7.1
|-
| align="left" | 
| align="left" | Dallas
| 72 || 64 || 24.4 || .643 || .000 || .575 || 7.5 || .9 || .3 || 1.5 || 6.1
|-
| align="left" | 
| align="left" | Dallas
| 80 || 80 || 23.0 || .650 || .000 || .638 || 7.1 || 1.0 || .3 || 1.2 || 5.7
|-
| align="left" | 
| align="left" | Dallas
| 55 || 47 || 23.3 || .624 || .333 || .604 || 7.3 || .6 || .3 || 1.4 || 6.0
|-
| align="left" | 
| align="left" | Miami
| 51 || 22 || 16.0 || .584 || .000 || .545 || 3.5 || .4 || .3 || .9 || 2.5
|-
| align="left" | 
| align="left" | Atlanta
| 15 || 0 || 5.5 || .125 || .000 || .000 || 1.7 || .3 || .1 || .3 || .1
|- class=“sortbottom"
| style="text-align:center;" colspan="2"| Career 
| 987 || 771 || 24.3 || .498 || .125 || .626 || 7.1 || .8 || .3 || 1.4 || 7.4

Playoffs

|-
| align="left" | 2005
| align="left" | Dallas
| 13 || 13 || 23.7 || .597 || .000 || .393 || 7.5 || .5 || .5 || 1.4 || 7.0
|-
| align="left" | 2006
| align="left" | Dallas
| 19 || 2 || 23.9 || .540 || .000 || .614 || 6.7 || .3 || .6 || 1.3 || 5.0
|-
| align="left" | 2007
| align="left" | Dallas
| 5 || 2 || 7.6 || .667 || .000 || .500 || 3.4 || .2 || .0 || .0 || 1.0
|-
| align="left" | 2008
| align="left" | Dallas
| 5 || 5 || 19.0 || .412 || .000 || .400 || 4.2 || .0 || .2 || .6 || 3.6
|-
| align="left" | 2009
| align="left" | Dallas
| 10 || 10 || 25.5 || .611 || .000 || .619 || 6.1 || .7 || .4 || .9 || 5.7
|-
| align="left" | 2010
| align="left" | Dallas
| 5 || 4 || 23.6 || .000 || .000 || .417 || 6.6 || .6 || .2 || 1.0 || 1.0
|-
| align="left" | 2012
| align="left" | Atlanta
| 4 || 0 || 13.8 || .538 || .000 || .667 || 3.5 || .0 || .0 || .3 || 4.0
|- class=“sortbottom"
| style="text-align:center;" colspan="2"| Career
| 61 || 36 || 21.7 || .541 || .000 || .525 || 6.1 || .4 || .4 || 1.0 || 4.7

See also
 List of National Basketball Association career blocks leaders

References

External links

ESPN.com – Erick Dampier

1975 births
Living people
20th-century African-American sportspeople
21st-century African-American sportspeople
African-American basketball players
American men's basketball players
Atlanta Hawks players
Basketball players from Jackson, Mississippi
Centers (basketball)
Dallas Mavericks players
Golden State Warriors players
Indiana Pacers draft picks
Indiana Pacers players
Miami Heat players
Mississippi State Bulldogs men's basketball players
People from Monticello, Mississippi